Great Expectations (Chinese: 远大前程) is a 2018 Chinese television series starring written by Chen Sicheng, starring himself alongside Yuan Hong, Tong Liya and Amber Kuo. The series airs on Hunan TV starting April 1, 2018.

Synopsis
The story is set in the 20th century, and follows Hong Sanyuan who travels to Shanghai together with his mom and close friend, Qi Lin to seek a better life. There, he came under the guidance of Yan Hua, a ferry worker who is seen as the leader by his contemporaries. In Shanghai, Hong Sanyuan becomes entangled in the power struggles between two large conglomerates, and eventually also gets involved in political affairs.

Cast

Main

Supporting

Special appearance

Production
Filming for the series took place from July to December 2016, taking a total of 155 days.

Soundtrack

Spin-off
A spin-off titled Great Expectations: Meeting of the Two Dragons (远大前程·双龙会) starts airing on Tencent Video from April 30, 2018. It will focus on the stories of Huo Zhenxiao (portrayed by Liu Haoran), Chen Zheng (portrayed by Chen Hao) and a new character portrayed by Shang Yuxian.

Awards and nominations

References

Chinese period television series
2018 Chinese television series debuts
Television series by Mango Studios
2018 Chinese television series endings